Amaryllis Hope Fox (born Amaryllis Damerell Thornber; September 22, 1980) is an American writer, television host, public speaker, and former Central Intelligence Agency (CIA) officer. She departed from her role at the CIA in 2010. Subsequently, Fox authored a memoir about her time in the CIA, entitled Life Undercover: Coming of Age in the CIA, published by Knopf Doubleday in October 2019. She is the host of the six-episode Netflix documentary series The Business of Drugs, released in July 2020.

Early life and education 
Fox was born Amaryllis Damerell Thornber in New York City. Her mother, Lalage Damerell, is an English retired actress. Her father was an economist. Fox's mother has since married billionaire businessman Steven M. Rales. When Fox was eight years old, she suffered the loss of her friend Laura in the bombing of Pan Am Flight 103 over Lockerbie, Scotland. She said of the event in an interview with the CBC, "I remember being very, very overwhelmed by the loss and my dad intervened and said, you have to understand the forces that took her or they will drown you." Fox describes the moment as pivotal for catalyzing increased awareness of current events and geopolitical conditions.

Growing up in Washington, D.C. and London, Fox attended the National Cathedral School beginning in eighth grade and graduated in 1998; she attended The American School in London during tenth grade. She completed undergraduate studies at the University of Oxford in 2002. Fox stated that while at Oxford, she rebuffed approaches from the Secret Intelligence Service. Prior to Fox's final year at Oxford, the September 11 attacks took place while she was visiting family in Washington, D.C.; subsequently, she decided to pursue a master's degree in conflict and terrorism at the Walsh School of Foreign Service. For her master's thesis, Fox developed an algorithm intended to identify local terrorist safe havens, which attracted attention from the CIA.

Career

Interview with Aung Sang Suu Kyi 
In 1999, at the age of 18, Fox clandestinely recorded an interview for the BBC with the Burmese leader Aung Sang Suu Kyi, then under house arrest. To arrange the meeting, Fox worked with a local dissident journalist with whom she communicated via taped messages inside the water tank of a toilet at a café in Rangoon. Her intent in the trip had been to make a secret recording of planned pro-democracy protests on September 9. A book, called "In the Quiet Land" was set to be published in 2002, with film rights optioned to Golden Square Pictures and screenplay by Nick Thomas.

Central Intelligence Agency 
Fox became one of the youngest female officers in the CIA at the age of 22, assigned to "non-official cover," entailing living abroad with a fake identity and no diplomatic protections. Fox states her work focused on preventing terror organizations from acquiring weapons of mass destruction, assuming the cover of an art dealer. After eight years at the agency, Fox left the CIA in 2010.

Memoir and controversy 
Fox's memoir, entitled Life Undercover: Coming of Age in the CIA described her experiences as an officer. Prior to the book's release, numerous journalists and former CIA officers pointed out that her memoir's manuscript had been submitted to publisher Knopf Doubleday without first receiving approval from the CIA's Publication Review Board, a potential violation of nondisclosure agreements signed by CIA staff. Fox was represented in that process by attorney Mark Zaid. Some former CIA case officers have expressed skepticism about elements of Fox's accounts of events or raised questions regarding the circumvention of the CIA's lengthy approval process. Fox responded by stating that she had taken care not to reveal potentially sensitive details, and that some characters were composites.

Television and public speaking 
Fox is the host of the Netflix documentary series The Business of Drugs, for which she traveled to several countries while in the third trimester of pregnancy. The show investigates the supply chains, social effects, and legal issues specific to six types of drugs: cocaine, synthetics, heroin, meth, opioids, and cannabis. She speaks at events around the world on dialogue and peacekeeping. Apple is reportedly developing a TV series based on Fox's memoir that will star American actress Brie Larson, with Fox serving as an executive producer on the series.

Personal life 
Fox's first marriage was to a British man named Anthony; the marriage was annulled. Fox has a daughter named Zoë with her second husband, Dean Fox, a CIA officer who had previously served in Afghanistan, and with whom she lived undercover in Shanghai; they later divorced. Fox is currently married to Robert Kennedy III, the grandson of Robert F. Kennedy; they have a daughter named Bobby and a son named Cassius. Fox and Kennedy were introduced via a mutual friend at Burning Man, and married on Cape Cod in 2018.

References 

1980 births
American memoirists
American spies
Living people
People of the Central Intelligence Agency
Walsh School of Foreign Service alumni
Alumni of the University of Oxford
People from San Francisco
People from Los Angeles
American women television presenters
People from Washington, D.C.
People from London
American people of English descent